Zanelli is an Italian surname. Notable people with the surname include:

Angelo Zanelli (1879–1942), Italian sculptor
Geoff Zanelli (born 1974), American composer
Juan Zanelli (1906–1944), Chilean racing driver
Renan Zanelli (born 1992), Brazilian footballer
Renato Zanelli (1892–1935), Chilean opera singer

Italian-language surnames